115 Squadron or 115th Squadron may refer to:

 115 Squadron (Israel)
 No. 115 Squadron RCAF, Canada
 No. 115 Squadron RAF, United Kingdom
 115th Squadron (Iraq)
 115th Airlift Squadron, United States Air Force
 VFA-115, United States Navy
 VAW-115, United States Navy
 VMFA-115, United States Marine Corps